Janowicz is a Polish language surname, equivalent to English Johnson. Notable bearers include:
Jerzy Janowicz (born 1990), Polish professional tennis player
Mikolaj Janowicz Kiezgajlo,  (died c. 1450), Lithuanian nobleman from Deltuva
Ryszard Pędrak-Janowicz (1932, Lwów – 2004, Kraków), Polish luger
Stanislaw Janowicz Kiezgajlo (died 1526), Lithuanian nobleman
Victor Felix "Vic" Janowicz (1930–1996), American football halfback

Polish-language surnames
Patronymic surnames
Surnames from given names